During the 1931–32 season Foot-Ball Club Juventus competed in Serie A and Mitropa Cup.

Summary
The club transferred new players in to the roster such as Enzo Rosa and Brazilian Pietro Sernagiotto (who had  an agreement with Genova). Juventus clinched its second title in a row with 54 points one more from the previous campaign surpassing runner-up Bologna thanks to a powerful offense scoring 89 goals (65 in away) and conceded only 38.

Also Raimundo Orsi with 20 goals (included 5 penalties) became 5th best topscorer of the league.

Squad 

(Captain)
 II

 I

Competitions

Serie A

League table

Matches

Mitropa Cup

Quarterfinals

Semifinals

Statistics

Goalscorers
 

23 goals
  Raimundo Orsi

16 goals
 Giovanni Ferrari

15 goals
 Giovanni Vecchina

14 goals
 Federico Munerati

12 goals
  Renato Cesarini

5 goals
 José Maglio

4 goals
 Mario Varglien

3 goals
  Luis Monti

2 goals
 Luigi Bertolini

1 goal
 Enzo Rosa
  Pietro Sernagiotto
 Giovanni Varglien

References

External links 

Juventus F.C. seasons
Juventus
Italian football championship-winning seasons